Walpi is a Hopi village established around 900 AD. It is located above Arizona State Route 264, east of the Grand Canyon in Navajo County, northern Arizona. Walpi is the Hopi term for "place of the notch." Historically, the village has also been known as Ash Hill Terrace, Gaspe, Gualpi, Hualpi, Kuchapturela, Valpee, and Wolpi. Walpi became the official name as a result of a decision of the Board on Geographic Names in 1915.

The villages of Sichomovi and Tewa (Hano) are also on First Mesa, both established after the Pueblo Revolt of 1680 against the Spanish missions.

History
Walpi, of the Hopi people, is one of the older continuously inhabited villages in the United States, continuously inhabited for more than 1100 years since around 900 AD. It is an example of traditional Hopi stone architecture, used for their historic pueblos built at defensive locations on the mesa tops.

The stone pueblo subtly rising from the stone mesa was well documented by photographs in the latter 19th century, by Edward S. Curtis, John K. Hillers, and others. Ansel Adams continued in the 20th century, along with increasing tourists' 'snapshots' via Fred Harvey bus tours and their own automobiles up from Route 66.

Present day
The First Mesa Tourism Program describes the village of Walpi as "a living village where the homes are passed down through matrilineal clan lineage."

About half a dozen in number live in the ancient stone dwellings, without running water or electricity, in the traditional manner.

Access
Walpi is accessible to visitors by guided tours, given by the First Mesa Consolidated Villages' Tourism Program.

See also
Hopi mythology
Hopi Kachina dolls

References

 Entry in The Columbia Encyclopedia, Sixth Edition 2006
 Britannica entry

External links
Experience Hopi: Walpi village tour
Hopi Villages — on First Mesa, Second Mesa, and Third Mesa
Digital Denver Library.org: Walpi images from 1910-1920 — online gallery.

Hopi
Pueblo great houses
Populated places in Navajo County, Arizona
Native American history of Arizona
Road-inaccessible communities of Arizona
Hopi Reservation
Pueblos in New Mexico